Segunda Angostura is a sound of the Strait of Magellan between the Patagonian mainland and Tierra del Fuego. It is located southwest of Primera Angostura, the narrowest part of the Strait between the island and the continent. The sound was named Segunda Angostura (Spanish for Second Narrows) as it was the second narrows of the strait that ships met when sailing through the strait from east to west.

See also
 Primera Angostura

Landforms of Tierra del Fuego
Strait of Magellan
Sounds of Chile
Bodies of water of Magallanes Region